Sheri Moir (born September 17, 1981) is a Canadian figure skater. She competed in ice dancing with her cousin Danny Moir. They are the 2001 Canadian national junior silver medalists and placed 11th at the 2001 World Junior Figure Skating Championships. They competed for two seasons on the Junior Grand Prix and placed 11th at the 2001 Nebelhorn Trophy.

Following her ice dancing career, Moir switched to synchronized skating. She competes on Canada's NEXXICE team, who won the bronze medal at the 2007 World Synchronized Skating Championships.

Moir was born in London, Ontario. She is the cousin of Scott Moir.

External links
 Nexxice
 

1981 births
Canadian female ice dancers
Living people
Skating people from Ontario
Sportspeople from London, Ontario